The 2011–12 NBL season is the 13th season for the Cairns Taipans in the NBL.

Roster

Depth chart

Regular season

Standings

Game log

|- style="background-color:#bbffbb;"
| 1
| 8 October
| Townsville
| W 81-76
| Jamar Wilson (23)
| Dusty Rychart (14)
| Jamar Wilson,  Brad Hill & Jeff Dowdell (4)
| The Snakepit  
| 1-0
|- style="background-color:#ffcccc;"
| 2
| 14 October
| @ Townsville
| L 76-95
| Andrew Warren (16)
| Dusty Rychart (8)
| Kerry Williams &  Jamar Wilson (3)
| The Swamp 
| 1-1
|- style="background-color:#bbffbb;"
| 3
| 16 October
| @ Gold Coast
| W 91-82
| Andrew Warren (28)
| Jamar Wilson (6)
| Brad Hill (7)
| The Furnace 
| 2-1
|- style="background-color:#ffcccc;"
| 4
| 28 October
| Wollongong
| L 64-69
| Brad Hill (19)
| Aaron Grabau & Brad Hill (7)
| Jamar Wilson (4)
| The Snakepit 
| 2-2
|-

Player statistics

Regular season

Finals

Awards

Player of the Week

Player of the Month

Coach of the Month

See also
2011–12 NBL season
Cairns Taipans

References

External links
 Official Website

Cairns Taipans
Cairns Taipans seasons